Robert Harland is an actor.

Robert Harland may also refer to:

Sir Robert Harland, 1st Baronet (1715–1784), Royal Navy officer
Sir Robert Harland, 2nd Baronet (1765–1848), of the Harland baronets
 Bob Harland (footballer) (1916–2006), Australian rules footballer